Ulfsson is a surname. Notable people with the surname include:

Gunnbjörn Ulfsson (Norwegian, lived circa 10th century), the first European to sight North America
Jakob Ulfsson (died 1521), Archbishop of Uppsala, Sweden, 1469–1515 and founder of Uppsala University
Ragnvald Ulfsson (beginning 11th century) was a jarl of Västergötland or Östergötland
Sveinn Ulfsson (1019–1074), King of Denmark from 1047 until his death in 1074

See also
Usson (disambiguation)